The following is a timeline of the history of Hanoi, the capital city of Vietnam:

Prehistory

  BCE — The Bronze-Age Dong Son culture of the Lac people occupies the Red River valley

Van Lang
  BCE — According to much later sources, the area of present-day Hanoi formed part of the Giao Chỉ region of Van Lang
  BCE — The Âu Việt, united under the Shu emigrant Shu Pan, invade and conquer Van Lang

Au Lac
  BCE — Co Loa established by Shu Pan in the present city's Dong Anh district to serve as the capital of the unified kingdom of Au Lac

Qin Empire
 214 BCE — The First Emperor begins his campaign against the Baiyue people of the south
 208 BCE — General Zhao Tuo defeats Shu Pan and takes Co Loa, incorporating it into his Nanhai Commandery

Nanyue
 204 BCE — Zhao Tuo declares his realm the independent kingdom of Nanyue
 196 BCE — Lu Jia secures the nominal submission of Nanyue to Han
 179 BCE — By this point, Nanyue's lands in the Red River valley have been organized as the commandery of Jiaozhi

Han Empire
 111 BCE — The commander of Jiaozhi submits to Han following Lu Bode's razing of the capital Panyu, remaining in his post and beginning the "First Northern Domination" of Vietnam.
 208 CE — Longbian erected in its eponymous district
 226 — A Roman embassy arrives

Liu Song Empire
 454  464 — Songping (Tong Binh) established by the Liu Song on the south bank of the Red River in Hanoi's Tu Liem and Hoai Duc districts

Van Xuan
 544 — Long Biên serves as the capital of Ly Bi's realm of Van Xuan

Tang Empire
 621 — Longbian and Songping briefly elevated to prefectural status as Longzhou and Songzhou
 722 — Songping falls to Mai Thúc Loan
 late 8th century — Zhang Boyi erects Luocheng ("Enclosing Wall[ed City]") in the present city's Ba Dinh district
 early 9th century — Luocheng renamed Jincheng ("Golden Wall[ed City]")
 866 — Gao Pian, the local jiedushi, expands the fortress at Jincheng and renames it Da Luocheng ("Big Enclosing Wall[ed City]")

Dai Viet
 1010 — Luocheng renamed Thang Long with the erection of its Imperial Citadel and dedication as the capital of the Lý dynasty.
 Quán Thánh Temple built.
 1049 — One Pillar Pagoda built.
 1070 — Temple of Literature built.
 1076 — Imperial Academy established.

Medieval period
 1225 — City becomes capital of the Trần dynasty.
 1258, 1285 and 1288 — the city had been sacked and burned by Mongol. All previous constructions were destroyed as the city was rebuilt later.
 15th century — Temple of the Jade Mountain and Quán Sứ Temple built.
 1408 — City renamed Dōngguān ("Eastern Gateway"; Đông Quan in Vietnamese) by the Chinese Ming dynasty.
 1428 — City renamed Đông Kinh (as known by Westerners as Tonkin.
 1573 — "Foggy Lake" renamed West Lake.
 1615 — Trấn Quốc Pagoda relocated to West Lake.
 1656 — Láng Temple renovated.
 1686 — Perfume Pagoda expanded.
 1730s — Trúc Lâm Palace built at Trúc Bạch Lake.
 1802 — Vietnamese capital relocated to Huế. Most royal palaces were destroyed during the previous Tay Son rebellion (1771—1789).
 1812 — Flag Tower built.
 1831 — City renamed Hà Nội ("Between Rivers" or "River Interior") by Nguyễn emperor Minh Mạng.

French occupation (19th-20th c.)
 1873 — November 20: Francis Garnier of France takes citadel.
 1874 — French concession granted per treaty.
 1882 — French occupation begins.
 1883
 May 19: Battle of Cầu Giấy (Paper Bridge) fought near city.
 August 15: Battle of Phủ Hoài fought near city.
 1884 — L'Avenir du Tonkin French newspaper begins publication.
 1886
 Kinh Thien Palace built.
 Turtle Tower built in Hoàn Kiếm Lake.
 1887 — Banque de l'Indochine branch opens.
 1888 — St. Joseph's Cathedral built.
 1889 — City area expanded with land from Tho Xuong and Vinh Thuan districts.
 1890
 Steamboat begins operating on the Red River.
 Racecourse opens.
 1894 — Lanessan Hospital built for French military.
 1898
 Hỏa Lò Prison built.
 Geological Museum established.
 1900 — École française d'Extrême-Orient headquartered in Hanoi.
 1902
 City becomes capital of French Indochina.
 Hanoi Railway Station opens.
 Indochina Medical College founded.
 Indo China Exposition Française et Internationale (world's fair) held.
 Population: 150,000.
 1903 — Long Biên Bridge constructed.
 1906
 Presidential Palace built.
 University of Indochina established.
 1908 — Collège du Protectorat established.
 1910
 Phùng Khoang Church built.
 Museum of archaeology and ethnology organized.
 1911 — Hanoi Opera House built.
 1917
 Indochinese Central Archives set up.
 Bach Mai Airfield constructed.
 1919 — Lycée Albert Sarraut and Bibliothèque Centrale Hanoi established.
 1925 — Ecole des Beaux-arts d'Indochine opens.
 1926 — Musee Louis Finot established.
 1929 — March: Vietnamese Communist Party organized on Ham Long Street.
 1930
 Provisional Vietnamese Communist Party headquartered on Tho Nhuom Street.
 Đồng tử quân youth scouting group formed.
 1932 — Cửa Bắc Church built.
 1934 — Hàm Long Church built.
 1936
 Gia Lam Airfield constructed.
 Indochina Communist Party headquartered on Phung Hung Street.

Japanese occupation
 1941 — December 7: Japanese occupation begins.
 1942 — Hoan Long District (now Ba Đình District) becomes part of city.

French reoccupation
 1945
 Japanese occupation ends.
 September 2:  Ho Chi Minh reads the Proclamation of Independence of the Democratic Republic of Vietnam in Ba Đình Square.
 Vietnam National University and National Library of Vietnam established.
 Voice of Vietnam begins broadcasting.
 Tran Van Lai becomes mayor.
 1946
 March 2: National Assembly meets in the Great Theatre.
 December 19: Battle of Hanoi begins.
 1947 — February 17: Battle of Hanoi ends; French in power.
 1951 — Hanoi National University of Education established.

Democratic Republic of Vietnam
 1954
 City becomes capital of independent North Vietnam.
 People's Open Air Theatre active.
 Hanoi Radio begins broadcasting.
 1955 — College of Foreign Languages founded.
 1956 — Vietnam School of Music, University of Agriculture and Forestry, and Hanoi University of Science and Technology  established.
 1958
 National Museum of Vietnamese History established.
 Thanh Niên Road constructed between Trúc Bạch Lake and West Lake.
 1959
 Vietnam Museum of Revolution, Hanoi University of Foreign Studies, and Electricity Water Resources Academy established.
 Vietnam Military History Museum inaugurated.
 1960
 Foreign Trade University and Roman Catholic Archdiocese of Hanoi established.
 Population: 414,620 city; 643,576 urban agglomeration.
 1961
 Cultural College of Hanoi established.
 School of Public Administration in operation.
 1962 — National Archives Center #1 established.
 1965 — Residents begin evacuating city on threat of airstrikes by United States forces.
 1966
 June 29: Aerial bombing outside city by United States forces.
 Vietnam National Museum of Fine Arts inaugurated.
 Le Quy Don Technical University established.
 1967
 Aerial bombing by U.S.; air battles between U.S. and North Vietnamese forces.
 D67 underground command bunker installed at Kinh Thien Palace.
 1968 — Hànội mói newspaper in publication.
 1969 — Hanoi Architectural University and Foreign Language Specialized School established.
 1970 — Vietnam Television begins broadcasting.
 1972
 April: Bombing by United States forces.
 December: Aerial bombing by United States forces.
 1974 — Central Secondary School of Archives and Office Skills established.
 1975 — Ho Chi Minh Mausoleum inaugurated.
 1976 — City becomes capital of Socialist Republic of Vietnam.
 1978 — Noi Bai International Airport opens.
 1979 — Population: 879,500.
 1980 — Hanoi Institute of Theatre and Cinema founded.
 1984 — Vietnam National Symphony Orchestra revived.
 1985
 Chương Dương Bridge built.
 Hanoi – Amsterdam High School established.
 1988 — Vietnam-Russia Tropical Centre headquartered in Hanoi.
 1989 — Population: 1,089,760 city; 3,056,146 urban agglomeration.
 1990 — Ho Chi Minh Museum established.
 1992 — Population: 1,073,760.
 1993
 Vietnam War Memorial erected.
 Hanoi University of Science in operation.
 Mai art gallery opens.
 1995
 Institut de la Francophonie pour l'Informatique founded.
 Vietnamese Women's Museum dedicated.
 1997
 Vietnam Museum of Ethnology opens.
 November: Organisation internationale de la Francophonie summit held.
 1998
 March 24: Turtle sighting in Hoàn Kiếm Lake.
 Hàng Đẫy Stadium opens.
 Hanoi Garden opens.
 1999 — Population: 1,523,936.

21st century

 2001 — Trang Tien Plaza (shopping center) in business.
 2002 — National Archives Center #3 opens.
 2003
 Mỹ Đình National Stadium opens in Từ Liêm District.
 November: City hosts meeting of Asian Network of Major Cities 21.
 2005 — Hanoi Securities Trading Center launched.
 2006
 Vietnam National Convention Center built in Từ Liêm District.
 FPT University established.
 November: Asia-Pacific Economic Cooperation meeting held.
 2008
 Hanoi Capital Region created to include 29 districts; population expands to 6,232,940.
 Thanh Trì Bridge and Vĩnh Tuy Bridge constructed.
 Ba Dinh Hall demolished.
 2009 — October–November: 2009 Asian Indoor Games held.
 2010
 July: 2010 Asian Junior Athletics Championships held.
 October: Millennial Anniversary of Hanoi.
 Hanoi Museum opens.
 2011 — Keangnam Hanoi Landmark Tower built.

See also
 Hanoi history
 Districts of Hanoi
 List of Buddhist temples in Hanoi
 List of historical capitals of Vietnam
 Media of Vietnam

References

Bibliography

 
 
 
 .
 
 
 .
 
 .

External links

 
Hanoi
Hanoi
hanoi
Hanoi